Immaculate Conception Catholic Church in Lihue is a parish of the Roman Catholic Church of Hawaii in the United States.  Located in Lihue on the island of Kauai, the church falls under the jurisdiction of the Diocese of Honolulu and its bishop.  It is named after the Blessed Virgin Mary. The church was built in 1924.

References

Roman Catholic Diocese of Honolulu
Buildings and structures in Kauai County, Hawaii
Roman Catholic churches in Hawaii